The Rensselaer Holiday Tournament was a college ice hockey tournament hosted by the Rensselaer Polytechnic Institute in Troy, New York.  The tournament was held annually for a duration of sixty years, from 1951 to 2010 at the Houston Field House.  It was, at various times, known as the Rensselaer Invitational, RPI Invitational, RPI Invitational Christmas Tournament, RPI Christmas Tournament, Rensselaer/Midland Bank Holiday Tournament, Rensselaer/HSBC Holiday Tournament and Rensselaer/Bank of America Holiday Tournament. It was the oldest college hockey tournament in the United States, older than the Beanpot by a year. Since the tournament has not been renewed since the 2010-2011 season, The Beanpot is now the oldest.

In the first edition, eight teams played in a knockout bracket.  From 1952 until 1980, four teams played a round-robin.  Beginning in 1981, four teams were seeded and played a bracket format with a consolation game. Rensselaer won the championship for the first time in nearly a decade in what turned out to be the tournament's final year.

Results

References

College ice hockey tournaments in the United States
College sports tournaments in New York (state)
Ice hockey competitions in New York (state)
RPI Engineers men's ice hockey
Recurring sporting events established in 1951
1951 establishments in New York (state)